Vitré station (French: Gare de Vitré) is a railway station serving the town Vitré, Ille-et-Vilaine department, western France. It is situated on the Paris–Brest railway. The station is listed as "historical monument" since 1975.

In 1985, the clip of the music Another Brick from Fake (Swedish band), was also a big success internationally, was filmed on the railway and station of Vitré.

The station is served by high speed trains to Paris and Rennes, and by regional trains (TER Pays de la Loire) towards Rennes, Angers, Laval and Nantes.

See also 

 List of SNCF stations in Brittany

References

Railway stations in Ille-et-Vilaine
TER Bretagne
Railway stations in France opened in 1857
Monuments historiques of Ille-et-Vilaine
Vitré, Ille-et-Vilaine